Jayikkaanaay Janichavan is a 1978 Indian Malayalam-language film,  directed by J. Sasikumar and produced by Sreekumaran Thampi. The film stars Prem Nazir, M. G. Soman, Jayan, Sheela and Jagathy Sreekumar. The film has musical score by M. K. Arjunan.

Cast

Prem Nazir as Minnal Raju
Jayan as Prabhakara Varma
Sheela as Lakshmi
Jagathy Sreekumar as Sulaiman
KPAC Lalitha as Kalyani
Adoor Bhasi as Tharakan
Thikkurissy Sukumaran Nair as Malarthu Unnunni
Manavalan Joseph as Udaya Varma
Sreelatha Namboothiri as Marykutty 
Sreenivasan as Singer in a song 
Prathapachandran as Ananda Varma
M. G. Soman as Vaasu
Mallika Sukumaran as Rani
Thodupuzha Radhakrishnan as Chellappan
Vallathol Unnikrishnan as Raman Jyothsyar
Philomina as Kalyani's Aunt
Maniyanpilla Raju as Tharakan's sidekick
Haripad Soman as Union secretary
P. Sreekumar
Miss Vang as Miss Vang Karate Master
Master Rajakumaran Thampi as Young Raju
Mancheri Chandran as Prabhakaran's sidekick
Shanthan
Rajan as Bharani
Ramji
Aravindakshan
Ushile Mani

Soundtrack
The music was composed by M. K. Arjunan and the lyrics were written by Sreekumaran Thampi.

References

External links

view the film
 

1978 films
1970s Malayalam-language films
Films directed by J. Sasikumar